"In the Closet" is a song by American recording artist Michael Jackson, released on April 9, 1992, as the third single from his eighth album, Dangerous (1991). The song originally was intended as a duet between Jackson and Madonna, and features female vocals by "Mystery Girl", which was later revealed to be Princess Stéphanie of Monaco. Written and produced by Jackson and Teddy Riley, it became the album's third consecutive top ten pop single, reaching number six on the US Billboard Hot 100. It also became its second number one R&B single. In Europe, the song peaked at number eight on the UK Singles Chart, while reaching number one in Greece and number two in both Italy and Spain. In 2006, the song re-entered the UK chart, peaking at number 20. Its accompanying music video was directed by Herb Ritts and features supermodel Naomi Campbell.

Background
The song, written and composed by Michael Jackson and Teddy Riley, is about keeping a relationship secret between lovers. "In the closet" is an English idiom used when one is not open about an aspect of one's life, particularly in regard to sexual orientation. Despite the song's suggestive name, its lyrics do not allude to hidden sexual orientation but rather a concealed relationship; "Don't hide our love / Woman to man." The New York Times stated, "Only Jackson would use that title for a heterosexual love song..." The song's female vocal was originally labeled "Mystery Girl" but was later revealed to be Princess Stéphanie of Monaco.

Collaboration with Madonna
"In the Closet" was originally conceived as a duet between Jackson and Madonna. According to a 1992 interview with British journalist Jonathan Ross, Madonna said she worked on some lyrical ideas for the song but when she presented them to Michael, he decided they were too provocative and they decided not to continue with the project.

Critical reception
In an retrospective review, Chris Lacy from Albumism described "In the Closet" as a "hormone-soaked dance track". AllMusic editor Stephen Thomas Erlewine wrote that this song is fine and there's a lot to be said for professional craftsmanship at its peak and he highlighted it. Upon the release, Larry Flick from Billboard felt that the third single from Dangerous "proves to be his strongest single to date." He added, "Jackson's signature whoops and whispers are put at home within an intense and unusual jack-swing/funk arrangement. The track is brightened by an immediately memorable, sing-along chorus. Of course, much speculation surrounds the identity of the "mystery girl" who chats and groans in the background. Any ideas?" Clark and DeVaney from Cash Box commented, "Okay, we heard this song when the album first came out, except it only was the one mix, this CD-single contains seven mixes of various lengths totaling almost 45 minutes of the same whispering, whining, heavy breathing and mouth noises that seem to make perfect sense when considering it's Michael Jackson doing a song called "In the Closet." To find out what the hell it's all about, we'll have to watch the video premiere on Fox after The Simpsons." 

Also American essayist and music journalist Robert Christgau observed of the parent album, "he's hawking the most credible sex-and-romance of his career. ‘In the Closet’ implores his mystery woman to keep their—get this--"lust" behind closed doors. Soon he's going wild, or fabricating desperate nostalgia for their used-to-be." The Daily Vault's Michael R. Smith called it a "tongue-firmly-in-cheek hit". Pan-European magazine Music & Media stated that the song "is aimed at fast footwork reminiscent of his sister Janet's style." A reviewer from People Magazine complimented the "catchy chorus" as an "appealing element". Alan Light of Rolling Stone said "we get repressed lust in the titillatingly titled (and determinedly heterosexual)" song. He added that it has a "snaky, unexpected bridge."

Music video
The accompanying sepia colored music video for "In the Closet" was directed by Herb Ritts and features Jackson performing sensual dance routines with supermodel Naomi Campbell. The spoken vocals by Princess Stéphanie of Monaco were re-recorded by Campbell for the video. The short film was shot in late March 1992 in Salton Sea, California and premiered on April 23, 1992.

Formats and track listings

 In the Closet (UK single)
"In the Closet" (7" Edit) – 4:49
"In the Closet" (Club Mix) – 8:00
"In the Closet" (The Underground Mix) – 5:32
"In the Closet" (Touch Me Dub) – 7:53
"In the Closet" (KI's 12") – 6:55
"In the Closet" (The Promise) – 7:18

 In the Closet (US CD Single 49K74267)
"In the Closet" (Club Edit) – 4:07
"In the Closet" (The Underground Mix) – 5:34
"In the Closet" (The Promise) – 7:20
"In the Closet" (The Vow) – 4:49
"Remember The Time" (New Jack Jazz Mix) – 5:06

 In the Closet (US Promo CD Single ESK4537)
"In the Closet" (Radio Edit) – 4:37 (trayliner lists a time of 4:16)
"In the Closet" (7" Edit) – 4:49
"In the Closet" (The Mission Radio Edit) – 4:28
"In the Closet" (KI's 12") – 7:17 (trayliner lists a time of 6:57)
"In the Closet" (The Newark Mix) – 7:08 (trayliner lists a time of 6:51)
"In the Closet" (Freestyle Mix) – 6:34 (trayliner lists a time of 6:26)
"In the Closet" (The Mission) – 9:26

 In the Closet: Mixes Behind Door #1 (Japanese CD Single ESCA5610)
"In the Closet" (Club Mix) – 8:03
"In the Closet" (The Underground Mix) – 5:40
"In the Closet" (Touch Me Dub) – 6:42
"In the Closet" (KI's 12") – 7:17

 In the Closet: Mixes Behind Door #2 (Japanese CD Single ESCA5611)
"In the Closet" (The Mission) – 9:27
"In the Closet" (Freestyle Mix) – 6:35
"In the Closet" (The Mix Of Life) – 7:41
"In the Closet" (The Underground Dub) – 6:27

 In the Closet: Mixes Behind Door #3 (Japanese CD Single ESCA5622)
"In the Closet" (Club Edit) – 4:11
"In the Closet" (The Newark Mix) – 7:09
"In the Closet" (The Promise) – 7:26
"In the Closet" (The Vow) – 4:53
"Remember The Time" (New Jack Jazz 21) – 5:06

 In the Closet (UK PAL Visionary DualDisc Single 82876773342 5)
CD side
"In the Closet" (7" Edit) – 4:47
"In the Closet" (Club Mix) – 8:02
DVD side
"In the Closet" (Music video) – 6:02

 In the Closet (US NTSC Visionary DualDisc Single 82876773352 4)

CD side
"In the Closet" (7" Edit) – 4:47
"In the Closet" (Club Mix) – 8:02

DVD side
"In the Closet" (Music video) – 6:02
(Note: In the US Visionary was only sold as the complete boxset. Individual DualDiscs were not able to be purchased)

Personnel
Credits adapted from the album Dangerous.
Produced by Teddy Riley and Michael Jackson
Recorded and mixed by Bruce Swedien and Teddy Riley
Lead and background vocals, and vocal arrangement by Michael Jackson
Duet vocals by Mystery Girl (Princess Stéphanie of Monaco)
Rhythm arrangement, synthesizer arrangement, keyboards, and synthesizers by Teddy Riley

Charts

Weekly charts

Year-end charts

Certifications

See also
List of number-one dance singles of 1992 (U.S.)
List of number-one R&B singles of 1992 (U.S.)
Michael Jackson videography

References

1991 songs
1992 singles
Black-and-white music videos
Epic Records singles
Michael Jackson songs
Music videos directed by Herb Ritts
New jack swing songs
Number-one singles in Greece
Song recordings produced by Michael Jackson
Song recordings produced by Teddy Riley
Songs written by Michael Jackson
Songs written by Teddy Riley